John Leddy Phelan (1924 - 24 July 1976) was a scholar of colonial Spanish America and the Philippines.  He spent the bulk of his scholarly career at the University of Wisconsin, Madison.  Following his death, his notable former graduate student, James Lockhart, wrote  a candid obituary of his mentor.

Biography
He was born in Fall River, Massachusetts.

Phelan graduated from Harvard College cum laude in History in 1947; he earned his doctorate at University of California, Berkeley in 1951. His dissertation on the Franciscan Order in early colonial Mexico became the basis for his first book, The Millennial Kingdom of the Franciscans in the New World: A Study of the Writings of Gerónimo de Mendieta (1525-1604) (1956, 2nd edition 1970), which remains an important  work in the field of early Latin America.  Phelan’s monograph, The Hispanization of the Philippines: Spanish Aims and Filipino Responses(1959) continues to be one of the few works on the Spanish Empire focusing on the colonial Philippines and takes into account local responses to crown policies. His third monograph, The Kingdom of Quito in the Seventeenth Century: Bureaucratic Politics in the Spanish Empire (1967) is a mixture of political and social history, along with an important chapter on cultural history focusing on Mariana de Jesús de Paredes, known as  the "Lily of Quito." In 1968 the book was accorded honorable mention for the Bolton Prize of the Conference on Latin American History. His last monograph, The People and the King: The Comunero Revolution in Colombia 1781, was published posthumously and received the American Historical Association’s Beveridge Award in 1978. Phelan was elected Chairman of the Conference on Latin American History in 1973. He was a Guggenheim Fellow, American Council of Learned Societies Fellow, Newberry Library Fellow. He served on the editorial boards of Hispanic American Historical Review and The Americas.

He died in Madison, Wisconsin.

References

Harvard University alumni
University of California, Berkeley alumni
University of Wisconsin–Madison faculty
Historians of Franciscan history
Historians of Latin America
Historians of Mexico
Historians of Colombia
Historians of South America
People from Fall River, Massachusetts
Historians of the Philippines
1924 births
1976 deaths